Tarana railway station is a heritage-listed railway station located on the Main Western line in Tarana, City of Lithgow, New South Wales, Australia. It is also known as the Tarana Railway Station and yard group. The property was added to the New South Wales State Heritage Register on 2 April 1999.

It opened on 22 August 1872. The track was lifted from the northern platform in 1996 when the section of the Main Western line between Wallerawang and Tarana was singled.

It was the junction for the Oberon line that closed in 1979. The Oberon Tarana Heritage Railway group has a vision to restore the line from Oberon to Tarana.

Description 
The railway station complex comprises:
Station buildings
 station/residence - type 1, brick with extensions, 1872
 type 11, brick, 1915
Signal box - type 3, timber, skillion roof, 1916
Platform faces - brick
Dock platform
Pedestrian bridge, steel, c. 1916
Jib crane
Water tank - type 1 cast-iron, up platform, 
Station lighting and signs

Services
Tarana is served by NSW TrainLink's daily Central West XPT service operating between Sydney and Dubbo.  The XPT only stops here on request if passengers have booked to board/alight here. From 16 September 2019 the 4 times daily Bathurst Bullet also stops here.

 From 1 June 2020, bus route 598 operates a Monday to Friday morning bus service from Oberon connecting with the second Bathurst Bullet train to Sydney . In the afternoon the service to Oberon connects with the first Bathurst Bullet from Sydney.

Heritage listing 
As at 9 January 2008, the structures form a large group indicating the form of the site following duplication during 1916. It is largely intact, the only significant element missing being the goods shed. It contains a fine example of a station/residence in combination with a range of interesting supportive structures.
The station group forms one of the best station complexes surviving from the early period of railway construction.

Tarana railway station was listed on the New South Wales State Heritage Register on 2 April 1999 having satisfied the following criteria.

The place possesses uncommon, rare or endangered aspects of the cultural or natural history of New South Wales.

This item is assessed as historically rare. This item is assessed as arch. rare. This item is assessed as socially rare.

See also 

List of regional railway stations in New South Wales

References

Attribution

External links

Tarana station details Transport for New South Wales

New South Wales State Heritage Register
City of Lithgow
Articles incorporating text from the New South Wales State Heritage Register
Easy Access railway stations in New South Wales
Railway stations in Australia opened in 1872
Regional railway stations in New South Wales
Main Western railway line, New South Wales